Uroosa Qureshi is a Pakistani television actress and model. She is best known for her roles in Meenu Ka Susral, Daagh and Sartaj Mera Tu Raaj Mera for which she was nominated for Best Soap Actress at 4th Hum Awards.

Personal life
Qureshi is married to actor Bilal Qureshi

Television

Meenu Ka Susral,
Gila Kis Se Karein (2015)
Daagh
 Kala Jadoo
 Sartaj Mera Tu Raaj Mera
 Piya Ka Ghar Pyara Lagay
 Sitara Jahan Ki Betiyaan
 Choti Choti Khushiyaan
Mohe Piya Rang Laaga
Soteli Maamta

Awards and nominations

 Hum Award for Best Soap Actress - Sartaj Mera Tu Raaj Mera

References

Living people
People from Karachi
Pakistani television actresses
Punjabi people
Year of birth missing (living people)